Woden is an unincorporated community in Nacogdoches County, Texas, United States.

The area of Nacogdoches County was settled by immigrants from the Old South in the 1830s and was known as Jacobs, then later called King's Store. In 1886 a post office was established and the community was named Woden after the Old English deity Woden. In the 1890s, Woden residents moved the community to a location closer to a nearby railroad which had bypassed them, and named their new town Oval. In 1895 this town, at the current location, was then renamed Woden. The chief economic activity until the 1930s was logging, which later declined. Agriculture is now responsible for notable business in the region.

Although Woden is unincorporated, it has a post office, with the ZIP code of 75978; the ZCTA for ZIP Code 75978 had a population of 137 at the 2000 census.  Woden is home to a post office, a K-12 school, and a Baptist, Presbyterian, and United Pentecostal church, as well as a volunteer fire department.

Education
The community of Woden is served by the Woden Independent School District and home to the Woden High School Eagles.

The entire county is in the district for Angelina College.

References

External links
 

Unincorporated communities in Nacogdoches County, Texas
Unincorporated communities in Texas
Logging communities in the United States
Sundown towns in Texas